Daar buduq is a town in the Marodi Jeh province of Somaliland. Situated in the Hargeisa District, it is located northeast by road from Hargeisa and southwest of Berbera. 

The town is inhabited by people from the Adam Issa subdivisions of the Issa Musse clans. Isaaq Somali ethnic group. It is to the west of the hills of Adadleh.

See also
Administrative divisions of Somaliland
Regions of Somaliland
Districts of Somaliland

References

External links
Geographic Names

Populated places in Maroodi Jeex